Visions of Aftermath: The Boomtown is a 1988 video game published by Mindscape.

Gameplay
Visions of Aftermath: The Boomtown is a game in which the player attempts to survive after World War III.

Reception
Jasper Sylvester reviewed the game for Computer Gaming World, and stated that "Above all, Boomtown is a unique game that should especially appeal to those who like economic simulations and multi-player competitions."

References

External links
Review in Commodore Computing International

1988 video games
DOS games
DOS-only games
Mindscape games
Multiplayer video games
Post-apocalyptic video games
Role-playing video games
Simulation video games
Survival video games
Top-down video games
Video games about nuclear war and weapons
Video games developed in the United States